{{DISPLAYTITLE:E8 polytope}}

In 8-dimensional geometry, there are 255 uniform polytopes with E8 symmetry. The three simplest forms are the 421, 241, and 142 polytopes, composed of 240, 2160 and 17280 vertices respectively.

These polytopes can be visualized as symmetric orthographic projections in Coxeter planes of the E8 Coxeter group, and other subgroups.

Graphs
Symmetric orthographic projections of these 255 polytopes can be made in the E8, E7, E6, D7, D6, D5, D4, D3, A7, A5 Coxeter planes. Ak has [k+1] symmetry, Dk has [2(k-1)] symmetry, and E6, E7, E8  have [12], [18], [30] symmetry respectively. In addition there are two other degrees of fundamental invariants, order [20] and [24] for the E8 group that represent Coxeter planes.

11 of these 255 polytopes are each shown in 14 symmetry planes, with vertices and edges drawn, and vertices colored by the number of overlapping vertices in each projective position.

References
 H.S.M. Coxeter:
 H.S.M. Coxeter, Regular Polytopes, 3rd Edition, Dover New York, 1973
 Kaleidoscopes: Selected Writings of H.S.M. Coxeter, edited by F. Arthur Sherk, Peter McMullen, Anthony C. Thompson, Asia Ivic Weiss, Wiley-Interscience Publication, 1995, 
 (Paper 22) H.S.M. Coxeter, Regular and Semi Regular Polytopes I, [Math. Zeit. 46 (1940) 380-407, MR 2,10]
 (Paper 23) H.S.M. Coxeter, Regular and Semi-Regular Polytopes II, [Math. Zeit. 188 (1985) 559-591]
 (Paper 24) H.S.M. Coxeter, Regular and Semi-Regular Polytopes III, [Math. Zeit. 200 (1988) 3-45]
 N.W. Johnson: The Theory of Uniform Polytopes and Honeycombs, Ph.D. Dissertation, University of Toronto, 1966

Notes

8-polytopes
Polytope